Omega (Ωμέγα) is a 2008 Greek small budget-thriller film directed by Vasilis Blioumis. It was named the Best Full Length Greek Picture at the 8th Panorama of Independent Film Makers - T.U.C.TH. The film was accomplished in only 14 days/nights.

It was compared to Michael Haneke's Funny Games because of the similarities in the plot. However, Omega is very different stylistically, playing more as an On Stage film and belonging to a subgenre of cinema that could be described as "Isolated Cottage".

Synopsis 
The story begins with Margarita, a cold blooded doctor, who suffers from a brain tumor. Realizing her prognosis is terminal, she heads up to her cottage to spend some time with her husband and break the news to him. Things take a turn for the worse when a visitor shows up.

References

External links 
 

2000s thriller films
2000s Greek-language films
Greek thriller films